Ancillista rosadoi is a species of sea snail, a marine gastropod mollusk in the family Ancillariidae.

Description

Ancillista rosadoii is an olive-hued marine snail measuring about 24mm long.

Distribution

West Indian Ocean near Mozambique

References

http://www.bagniliggia.it/WMSD/HtmSpecies/2013009248.htm

Ancillariidae
Gastropods described in 2004